This is a list of Belgian television related events from 1970.

Events
3 February - Jean Vallée is selected to represent Belgium at the 1970 Eurovision Song Contest with his song "Viens l'oublier". He is selected to be the fifteenth Belgian Eurovision entry during Eurosong.

Debuts

Television shows

Ending this year

Births
17 July - Werner De Smedt, actor
5 August - Rani De Coninck, TV & radio host
22 December - Mathias Sercu, actor & writer

Deaths